is the fourth studio album by Japanese rock band Tokyo Jihen, released on February 24, 2010 in Japan through EMI Music Japan and Virgin Music. The album was produced by the band and Japanese recording engineer Uni Inoue.

On December 10, 2010, it was announced that "Sports" was named the iTunes Rewind 2010 Best Album of the Year in Japan.

Background
This is the first Tokyo Jihen album since 2007's Variety and vocalist Ringo Sheena made a comeback to a composer in the album. In 2008, Sheena focused on a string of releases to celebrate her 10th anniversary since her solo debut, such as a B-side collection, a singles box set and a string of concerts. In 2009, she released a new single, "Ariamaru Tomi", and an original album, Sanmon Gossip.

Recording and production 
Tokyo Jihen wrote Sports feature the theme of sports as the title. Band members got together, each bringing some demos which they each created imaging sports. They built instrumentation from demos in the recording studio and Sheena put words on them other than Ukigumo's tracks.

Release and promotion 
The first single released from the album was "Senkō Shōjo." It was released as a digital download in November 2007, two months after the release of their third album, Variety. It was written and recorded in the Variety sessions.
The second single, "Nōdōteki Sanpunkan," was released three months before the album, in December 2009. Both singles has commercial tie-ups. "Senkō Shōjo" was used in Subaru Stella car commercials, and "Nōdōteki Sanpunkan" was used in an Ezaki Glico Watering KissMint gum commercial, featuring Sheena as the spokesperson.

"Denpa Tsūshin", "Season Sayonara" and "Kachiikusa" were released in Chaku-uta and Chaku-Uta Full format prior to the album. "Kachiikusa" was used for the second batch of Watering KissMint commercials. It was released to radio, as well as cellphone download, on the 16th of January. It reached #30 on the Billboard Japan Hot 100 and #58 on the RIAJ Digital Track Chart Top 100. The band later performed this song on Music Station, a week before the album's release.

"Sweet Spot" was released as a digital download on iTunes on the 8th of February. It reached #13 on the Billboard Japan Hot 100 the week of the album's release.

Tokyo Jihen embarked on an all-country promotional concert tour, in March 2010.

Track listing 
Credits adapted from Ringo Sheena's website.

Notes:
"Season Sayonara" and "Sweet Spot" are stylized as "Season SAYONARA" and "SWEET Spot," respectively.
"Foul" and "Fair" are stylized in all uppercase.

Personnel

Tokyo Jihen
 Ringo Sheena – vocals
 Ukigumo – electric guitars and acoustic guitars, backing vocals
Ichiyo Izawa – keyboard instruments, synthesizers, electric guitars on "Senkō Shōjo"
 Seiji Kameda – bass
 Toshiki Hata – drums, percussion

Additional personnel
 Makoto Minagawa – synthesizers on "Senkō Shōjo"

Charts and certifications

Charts

Sales and certifications

Content and structure

The album, much like many of Sheena's solo works and the band's previous albums (such as Shōso Strip, Adult), features a symmetrical track list. Tracks are paired to another in title length, type of script and placement of grammatical particles. The official English titles given in the album's booklet also follow this theme (occasionally receiving non-direct translations to fit the theme).

"Ikiru" and "Kimaru" are both plain-form verbs with a single kanji (in fact, the standard reading of "極まる" is "kiwamaru"). Both songs end with a band arrangement and begin with a sparsely arranged section.

"Denpa Tsūshin" and "Senkō Shōjo" are both songs with four kanji in their titles. Both deal with electricity in some way.

"Season Sayonara" and "Sweet Spot" are both written in katakana. Both titles feature two words that begin with s sounds.

"Kachiikusa" and "Noriki" are both set phrases associated with sports. Both are continuative verb/noun compounds, with two kanji and one hiragana character.

"F.O.U.L." and "F.A.I.R." are both English words in Latin script. Unlike some previous pairs, such as "Meisai" and "Ishiki" which name the paired song in the lyrics, neither song is named in "F.A.I.R." (but both are named in "F.O.U.L.").

"Utenkekkō" and "Zettai Zetsumei" are four kanji compounds that are set phrases associated with sports.

In the vein of Kalk Samen Kuri no Hana and Sanmon Gossip, the central song with no paired track was the leading promotional song ("Nōdōteki Sanpunkan").

Release history

References

External links 
Tokyo Jihen Discography

Tokyo Jihen albums
2010 albums